Manuk Khachaturi Abeghyan (alternatively Manouk Abeghian or Manuk Abeghian,  1865 – 26 September 1944) was an Armenian philologist, literary scholar, folklorist, lexicographer and linguist. He authored numerous scholarly works, including a comprehensive two-volume history of old Armenian literature titled Hayots' hin grakanut'yan patmut'yun (1944–1946), and a volume on Armenian folklore, the German version of which is titled Der armenische Volksglaube. He worked extensively on the compilation and study of the Armenian national epic Daredevils of Sassoun. He is also remembered as the main designer of the reformed Armenian orthography used in Armenia to this day. He was a founding member of the Armenian National Academy of Sciences. The Institute of Literature of the National Academy of Sciences of Armenia is named in his honor.

Early life 
Manuk Abeghyan was born on  1865 in the village of Tazakand (modern-day Babak, Azerbaijan) in the Nakhichevan uezd of the Erivan Governorate of the Russian Empire. According to Hrachia Acharian, Abeghyan's original surname was Aghbeghian, which he later changed to the more Armenian-sounding Abeghyan. He attended a newly founded local school for about half a year, immediately showing great talent as a student. In 1876, the young Abeghyan was sent to study at the Gevorgian Seminary in Etchmiadzin. He graduated from the seminary in 1885 with highest honors.

Early career and education 
In 1887, Abeghyan was appointed teacher of Armenian language and literature at the Armenian diocesan school in Shusha, where he worked for two years. While in Shusha, he formed a literary circle with a few teachers at the diocesan school. In 1888, he presented to the public his new compilation of the Armenian epic Daredevils of Sassoun. That same year, he published a collection of poems titled  ("Samples"), which was received poorly and after which Abeghyan decided to abandon writing poetry. In 1889, he published his compilation of the Armenian national epic under the title  ("David and Mher"), which he had compiled in 1886 at the Gevorgian Seminary based on the telling of the seminary's janitor, who was from Moxoene in Ottoman Armenia. Abeghyan's work was received well by scholars and was the second compilation of Daredevils of Sassoun since Garegin Srvandztiants had first recorded it, further establishing the fact that it was not merely a local or regional tradition of the Armenians of Taron, but rather a genuine Armenian national epic. Also in 1889, he published his first scholarly study in the monthly  ("Hammer"), on the topic of the Armenian national epic.

Abeghyan was then invited to Tiflis to work as the teacher of Armenian language and literature at the Tiflis Hovnanian Girls' Academy. After moving to Tiflis, Abeghyan frequently wrote for the Armenian newspaper Nor-dar ("New Century"), sometimes using pseudonyms. His articles included reviews of books and plays and dealt with the contemporary issues of Armenian language, literature and theater. In 1891–1892, Abeghyan was the chief editor and publisher of Nor-dar, working closely with writers Nar-Dos and Muratsan. In 1889, he was elected head of the Tiflis commission for the publication of Armenian books. Around this time, he translated into Armenian a number of works by European and Russian authors, most notably Gogol's Taras Bulba.

Abeghyan desired to continue his work on Armenian folklore and literature using the most advanced scholarly methods of the time, and for this purpose he sought to acquire a higher education at a European university. In 1893, with the financial support of the oil magnate Alexander Mantashev, he left for Germany to continue his studies. He spent two semesters at the University of Jena, three at Leipzig University, and three at the University of Berlin. At the German universities, he studied philology, history, language and literature. In 1895, Abeghyan left German for Paris and attended courses of the Faculty of Philology of Sorbonne University as an auditor, focusing mainly on literature and literary theory.

In 1898, Abeghyan successfully defended his doctoral dissertation titled "Armenian Folk Belief" (Der Armenische Volksglaube) at the University of Jena, examined by classicist and Armenologist Heinrich Gelzer. His dissertation was published under the same title in 1899.

Career 
Abeghyan returned to Tiflis in 1898 and was immediately invited to teach at the Gevorgian Seminary, which he accepted. In 1898, he completed the voluminous work Hay zhoghovurdi araspelnerë Movses Khorenats'u Hayots' Patmut'yan mej, which was directed against the arguments made by Grigor Khalatiants about Movses Khorenatsi's History of Armenia. Abeghyan began cooperating with Komitas on the compilation of Armenian songs and published two collections of fifty songs each; another set of fifty songs remained unpublished.

Starting in 1906, Abeghyan began publishing a series of articles titled "Hay zhoghovrdakan vepë" ("The Armenian folk epic") in the journal Azgagrakan handes ("Ethnographical Journal"), continuing his study of the epic Daredevils of Sassoun on the basis of fifteen versions of it. In 1906, Abeghyan completed his influential grammar of modern Armenian titled Ashkharhabari k'erakanut'yun. In 1907, he wrote a grammar of Classical Armenian, which later served as the basis for his two-part textbook of Classical Armenian, published in Tiflis in 1915–16.

Death 
Abeghyan died on 26 September 1944 in Yerevan. He is buried at Tokhmakh cemetery in Yerevan.

Family 
Abeghyan had two sons: Mher Abeghyan, who was a painter, and Suren Abeghyan, who was an actor and playwright. Abeghyan's nephew, Artashes Abeghyan, was also a philologist.

References

Sources

External links 
Khoren Sargsian, Մանուկ Աբեղյանը և հայ հին գրականությունը [Manuk Abeghyan and old Armenian literature], Yerevan, 1946
Manuk Abeghyan's picture on the Yerevan State University website

1865 births
1944 deaths
Soviet Armenians
Armenian folklorists
Armenian literary critics
People from Nakhchivan
19th-century Armenian historians
20th-century Armenian historians
Armenian people from the Russian Empire